The Moths Are Real is a studio album by the singer-songwriter Serafina Steer. It was released in January 2013 by Stolen Recordings. It was produced by Jarvis Cocker.

Critical reception
The Quietus wrote that "this is never twee, but witty, subversive and at times sensual, the power dynamic between male and female, dream and reality hard to place as Steer's voice arches and meanders over the melody."

Track listing

References

2013 albums
Stolen Recordings albums